Friends Again is one-hour television program featuring bible teaching and prayers with Bishop Luis R. Santos, Pastora Norma S. Santos and Admin. Leslie S. Santos (with its very own worship team/band, IDO4).

History
In 1990, Jesus Christ To God Be the Glory Church International, Inc. led by Bishop Santos launched his own radio show, Friends Again aired at DWOO. 9 years later the show was aired on television, Fridays on IBC from its inception in 1999. In 2003, the show was also aired on RPN and SBN and they aired until December 26, 2007 when SBN becomes the blocktimer affiliate of ETC and RPN becomes the blocktimer affiliate of C/S on January 1, 2008. Friends Again will continue to aired on NBN for the short time between 2007-2008 until moving to Commercial Television in April 2008.

Move to Commercial Television (2008–2014)
In April 2008, Friends Again was moved from RPN, IBC, SBN and NBN to Commercial broadcaster Studio 23. The show which previously on Saturdays at 7:00 AM. from April 5 until August 2. Later in the same year, the show moves to Sunday at 8:00 AM. after Family Rosary Crusade which is aired at 7:00 AM. until January 2011 when both shows moved to an early time of 6:00 AM. for Family Rosary Crusade, and 7:00 AM. for Friends Again. On January 12, 2014, 5 days before the closing of Studio 23, Friends Again aired its last show before moving to Light Network. Since then, Friends Again aired on that channel every Saturday afternoon at 1:00 PM., with continuing coverage on the new channel S+A every Sunday morning, this time the show starts at 6:00 AM.

Hosts
Bishop Luis R. Santos - Head Pastor
Pastora Norma S. Santos - Pastor
Admin Leslie S. Santos - Church Administrator; Worship Lead, IDO4
Pastor Ludwig Santos - Assistant Pastor

Theme song
Since 2008, the theme song of the show, Friends Again is currently seen in the show's opener and it is performed by the church's music ministry, I.D.O.4.

External links
 Official Friends Again website
 Official Jesus Christ To God Be the Glory Church International, Inc. website
 Official I.D.04 website

Philippine religious television series
1990s Philippine television series
2000s Philippine television series
2010s Philippine television series
2020s Philippine television series
1999 Philippine television series debuts
2020 Philippine television series endings
Radio Philippines Network original programming
Intercontinental Broadcasting Corporation original programming
Southern Broadcasting Network
People's Television Network original programming
Studio 23 original programming
ABS-CBN Sports and Action original programming